Encef may refer to:

 Encef, a trade name in India for cefixime
 Encef, a trade name in India for ceftriaxone
 Encef, a trade name in Turkey for cefdinir

See also
 Ancef, a trade name for cefazolin